is a Japanese former figure skater. She has won nine senior international medals and competed at three Four Continents Championships, placing as high as fourth. She is the 2008 Japanese Junior national champion.

Career 
Imai began skating at age 9. In the 2008–09 season, Imai began competing on the Junior Grand Prix series. She won her JGP event in Belarus and went on to win the Japanese Junior title. She was 16th at the 2009 World Junior Championships. In 2009, Imai won bronze at her sole JGP event, in Hungary. She placed 6th on the senior level at the Japan Championships and was assigned to the 2010 Four Continents Championships, where she placed 5th. In 2010, Imai won gold at the Ondrej Nepela Memorial and debuted on the senior Grand Prix series, placing 5th at the 2010 Skate Canada International and 6th at the 2010 Trophee Eric Bompard.

In summer 2011, Imai sustained a stress fracture in her foot, keeping her off the ice for about two months. In September 2011, she moved to Detroit to be coached by Yuka Sato and Jason Dungjen. She won bronze at the 2012 Nebelhorn Trophy.  Imai returned to Japan in 2013, joining Rumiko Michigami. She won gold at the 2013 Ondrej Nepela Trophy. At the Japan Championships, Imai finished 5th.

Programs

Competitive highlights
GP: Grand Prix; CS: Challenger Series; JGP: Junior Grand Prix

Detailed results
Small medals for short program and free skating awarded only at ISU Championships.

References

 Coupe de Nice Senior Ladies Results http://www.nice-figure-skating-cup.com/2009_results/CAT006RS.HTM
 Ice Challenge Senior Ladies Results https://web.archive.org/web/20091101104757/http://www.slovakskating.org/results/2009/10/28/graz/CAT002RS.HTM
  Japan Junior Figure Skating Championships 2009

External links

 

Japanese female single skaters
1993 births
Living people
Sportspeople from Tokyo
Asian Games medalists in figure skating
Figure skaters at the 2011 Asian Winter Games
Medalists at the 2011 Asian Winter Games
Asian Games silver medalists for Japan